David Ulch is an American rugby league footballer who plays as a  and  for the Tampa Mayhem in the USA Rugby League. He was selected to represent the United States in the 2017 Rugby League World Cup.

Personal life
He works as a middle school teacher outside of rugby league. He is currently a Dean for Lake Gibson middle school.

References

External links
2017 RLWC profile

1984 births
Living people
American rugby league players
Schoolteachers from Florida
Place of birth missing (living people)
Rugby league locks
Rugby league props
Rugby league second-rows
Tampa Mayhem players
United States national rugby league team players